Garbagnate may refer to:

Garbagnate Milanese, a municipality in the province of Milan, Italy
Garbagnate Monastero, a municipality in the province of Lecco, Italy